Cristian Castro is a Mexican singer.

Cristian Castro may also refer to:
Cristian Castro Devenish (born 2001), Colombian footballer

See also
Cristina Castro Salvador (born 1969), Spanish athlete
Cristina Castro, American senator
Cristino Castro, Brazilian municipality